The Morane-Saulnier MS-700 Pétrel was a French four-seat cabin-monoplane designed and built by Morane-Saulnier, only three prototypes were built.

Design and development
The MS-700 was a twin-engined, low-wing, cabin-monoplane with a retractable tricycle landing gear and powered by two  Potez 4D-33 four-cylinder, inverted inline piston engines. The prototype, with French test registration F-WFDC, first flew on 8 January 1949. The aircraft was intended as a light liaison aircraft and the second prototype made a demonstration tour of Africa at the end of 1950. The second prototype was re-engined with two Mathis G8-20 engines and re-designated MS-701. On 3 January 1951 a third prototype first flew, it was a MS-703 with a longer fuselage for six-seats and two  Salmson 8.AS.OO engines. After being used by the company for a number of years the first prototype was due to be modified in the late 1950s to the same standards as the MS-703 but with  Potez engines but it was not converted and instead was withdrawn from use. Only the three prototypes were built and the type did not enter production.

Variants
MS-700-01
First prototype of the Four-seat MS-700 variant, powered by two  Potez 4D-33 engines. First flown on 8 January 1949 the MS-700-01 (regn. F-WFDC) was withdrawn from use in June 1959.
MS-700-02
Second prototype of the MS-700 series, powered by two  Potez 4D-31 engines, converted to MS-701 standard (regn. F-BFDE).
MS-701
Second prototype, MS-700-02, re-engined with two  Mathis G8-20 engines.
MS-702
No details.
MS-703-01
Six-seat variant powered by two  Salmson 8.AS.00 / Argus As 10 engines, one built. The MS-703-01 was first flown on 3 January 1951.
MS-704
Proposed modification of the first prototype to MS-703 standard with two  Potez engines, not converted.

Specification (MS-700-01)

Notes

Bibliography
 Chillon, Jacques. Dubois, Jean-Pierre and Wegg, John. French Postwar Transport Aircraft, Air-Britain, 1980, .

Further reading

1940s French civil utility aircraft
Petrel
Low-wing aircraft
Aircraft first flown in 1949